Scopula caricaria is a moth of the family Geometridae. It is found in Spain, Italy, France, Liechtenstein, Germany, Austria, Switzerland, Poland, the Czech Republic, Slovakia, Hungary, Romania, Slovenia, Croatia, Bosnia and Herzegovina, Finland, Estonia, Latvia, north-western Russia, Belarus and Ukraine.

Adults are on wing from July to September in one generation per year. Although there is a partial second generation in the southern part of the range.

The larvae feed on Centaurea and Artemisia species.

References

External links
Lepiforum.de

Moths described in 1853
Moths of Europe
caricaria